The Mastrafjord Tunnel is a subsea road tunnel in Stavanger municipality in Rogaland county, Norway. The tunnel opened in 1992 as part of the European route E39 highway and the Rennesøy Fixed Link (which also includes the Byfjord Tunnel). The southern end of the tunnel is located near the village of Askje on Mosterøy and the northern end of the tunnel is in the village of Vikevåg on Rennesøy.

References

Subsea tunnels in Norway
Road tunnels in Rogaland
Stavanger
European route E39 in Norway
1992 establishments in Norway
Tunnels completed in 1992